George James Pallett (1907-1996) was a male athlete who competed for England.

Athletics career
He competed for England in the long jump at the 1934 British Empire Games in London.

Pallett was a president of the Herne Hill Harriers and was a qualified AAA coach in all field events.

References

1907 births
1996 deaths
English male long jumpers
Athletes (track and field) at the 1934 British Empire Games
Commonwealth Games competitors for England